Pleurotomella coelorhaphe is a species of sea snail, a marine gastropod mollusk in the family Raphitomidae.

Description
The shell grows to a length of 7 mm.

Distribution
This species occurs in the Atlantic Ocean off the Azores.

References

 Gofas, S.; Le Renard, J.; Bouchet, P. (2001). Mollusca, in: Costello, M.J. et al. (Ed.) (2001). European register of marine species: a check-list of the marine species in Europe and a bibliography of guides to their identification. Collection Patrimoines Naturels, 50: pp. 180–213
 Figueira R.M. Andrade & Absalão R.S. (2012) Deep-water Raphitomidae (Mollusca, Gastropoda, Conoidea) from the Campos Basin, southeast Brazil. Zootaxa 3527: 1–27.

External links
 Dautzenberg P. & Fischer H. (1896). Dragages effectués par l'Hirondelle et par la Princesse Alice 1888–1895. 1. Mollusques Gastéropodes. Mémoires de la Société Zoologique de France. 9: 395–498, pl. 15–22
 
 
 Gofas, S.; Luque, Á. A.; Templado, J.; Salas, C. (2017). A national checklist of marine Mollusca in Spanish waters. Scientia Marina. 81(2) : 241–254, and supplementary online material
  Serge GOFAS, Ángel A. LUQUE, Joan Daniel OLIVER,José TEMPLADO & Alberto SERRA (2021) - The Mollusca of Galicia Bank (NE Atlantic Ocean); European Journal of Taxonomy 785: 1–114

coelorhaphe
Gastropods described in 1896